Zdeněk Pouzar (born 13 April 1932) is a Czech mycologist. Along with František Kotlaba, he published several works about the taxonomy of polypore, corticioid, and gilled fungi. Pouzar is a noted expert on stromatic pyrenomycetes. Until 2012, he was the editor-in-chief of the scientific journal Czech Mycology.

References

1932 births
Czech mycologists
Living people